Mihrimah Sultan ("sun and moon" or "light of the moon"; 10 June 1812 – 31 August 1838) was an Ottoman princess, the daughter of Sultan Mahmud II, and his consort Hoşyar Kadın. She was the half-sister of Sultans Abdulmejid I and Abdulaziz.

Early life
Mihrimah Sultan was born on 10, 12 or 29 June 1812 in the Topkapı Palace. Her father was Sultan Mahmud II, and her mother was Hoşyar Kadın, She had a younger full sister, Zeynep Sultan, three years younger than her and dead in infancy. 

Before the birth of Mihrimah, Mahmud had two children the same year, Şehzade Bayezid and Şah Sultan. The sultan commemorated the births of his three children together.

Marriage
When time came to get her a husband, her mother resolved that she should make her choice. Her mother showed her the portraits of several young men, and she fixed upon Said Mehmed Pasha. Upon the order of Mahmud, she was betrothed to the Admiral of the Fleet Mehmed Said Pasha in 1835. A dowry was prepared within a year.

Julia Pardoe reports an incident that occurred on the occasion of Mihrimah's wedding. In fact, at the time of composing her dowry, the palace informed Mahmud that there were no more imperial jewels for the princess, because Saliha Sultan, Mihrimah's half-sister who had married the year before, had demanded them all for her and not had ever given him back. Besides, she never wore them, because she was too proud to lead a worldly life. Mahmud proposed to sell them, but she replied that no one would dare to buy the jewels of a princess. Mahmud then offered to buy them himself, and Saliha was forced to accept.

The marriage took place on 28 April 1836 in the Beşiktaş Waterfront Palace, when Mihrimah was twenty four years old. After the marriage was completed, 15,000 kuruş were conceded to Mihrimah Sultan. Grand Vizier Mahmud Rauf Pasha and Şeyhülislam Asim Efendi were conceded 1000 kuruş. The pashas were conceded 500 Kuruş. Damat Gürcü Halil Rifat Pasha, the husband of her half-sister Saliha also conceded some cents. The dowry of Mihrimah Sultan was prepared in Serasker.

. Wedding shows of Mihrimah Sultan were held in the vicinity of Dolmabahçe like that of Saliha Sultan. These entertainments lasted for days. Finally, an enormous bride regiment was organized and Mihrimah Sultan was sent to her palace. The marriage was consummated on 9 May 1836 in the Bebek Palace. At the wedding of Mihrimah Sultan, where tremendous lighting shows were held and the people watched with great enthusiasm and admiration.

Shortly after his marriage to Mihrimah, Said Pasha had incurred her father's displeasure and been exiled to the provinces, much to his wife's and mother-in-law's distress. At this time her mother had sufficiently sure of her influence to petition Mahmud directly, and did so in a letter. She followed this up with two letters of thanks, one when Mahmud granted her request, and ordered Said Pasha brought back to Istanbul, the other when he actually arrived.

The couple had one son, Sultanzade Mehmed Abdullah Bey, born and dead on 3 July 1838.

Death
Mihrimah Sultan died on 31 August 1838 of most likely tuberculosis which was raging in Istanbul in the nineteenth century,  she was buried in the mausoleum of her grandmother in Fatih, Istanbul. Having had a stillbirth only two months before, it is likely that she was also weakened by the birth.  

It was said that Mihrimah loved her father very much that she once wished that she wouldn't be alive to see the death of her father. Her wish was fulfilled and she died before Mahmud's death. Mahmud was really saddened of her death he died the next year in 1839. After her death her father contrived a fountain named Sultan Mahmud Fountain beside Nişancılar Mosque in Eyüp in the memory of his daughter.

Mihrimah was also immensely loved by her mother Hoşyar Kadın, who after her death declared that "my last joy died with my daughter".

Issue
Together with Mehmed Said Pasha Mihrimah had one son: 
 Sultanzade Mehmed Abdullah Bey (3 July 1838 – 3 July 1838)

See also
 List of Ottoman princesses

Ancestry

References

Sources
 
 
 
 

1812 births
1838 deaths
Royalty from Istanbul
19th-century Ottoman princesses
Deaths in childbirth